Imma infima is a moth in the family Immidae. It was described by Edward Meyrick in 1930. It is found on the Comoros, Mauritius, Réunion and in Sierra Leone.

The larvae have been recorded feeding on Agarista salicifolia.

Subspecies
Imma infima infima
Imma infima borbonensis Viette, 1988 (Réunion)

References

Moths described in 1930
Immidae
Moths of Africa
Lepidoptera of Réunion
Moths of Mauritius